Apna Banake Dekho is a 1962 Hindi film starring Manoj Kumar, Asha Parekh, Nazir Hussain, Sunder etc.

Soundtrack
Music was conducted by Ravi & lyrics were by S. H. Bihari & Asad Bhopali.

Reception

Leading lady Asha Parekh wrote in her 2017 "The Hit Girl":  "Apna Banake Dekho did not do well, perhaps because it was not particularly made."

References

External links

1962 films
1960s Hindi-language films
Films scored by Ravi